is a railway station on the Iida Line in the town of Matsukawa, Shimoina District, Nagano Prefecture, Japan operated by Central Japan Railway Company (JR Central).

Lines
Kamikatagiri Station is served by the Iida Line and is 146.9 kilometers from the starting point of the line at Toyohashi Station.

Station layout
The station consists of two opposed ground-level side platforms connected by a level crossing.  The station is unattended.

Platforms

Adjacent stations

History
Kamikatagiri Station opened on 22 November 1920. With the privatization of Japanese National Railways (JNR) on 1 April 1987, the station came under the control of JR Central. A new station building was completed in February 2009.

Passenger statistics
In fiscal 2016, the station was used by an average of 384 passengers daily (boarding passengers only).

Surrounding area
 Matsukawa High School

See also
 List of railway stations in Japan

References

External links

 Kamikatagiri Station information 

Railway stations in Nagano Prefecture
Railway stations in Japan opened in 1920
Stations of Central Japan Railway Company
Iida Line
Matsukawa, Nagano (Shimoina)